KSKR may refer to:

 KSKR (AM), a radio station (1490 AM) licensed to Roseburg, Oregon, United States
 KSKR-FM, a radio station (101.1 FM) licensed to Sutherlin, Oregon, United States